Parliamentary elections were held in Hungary between 28 May and 2 June 1922. The result was a victory for the Unity Party (a renamed National Smallholders and Agricultural Labourers Party), which won 140 of the 245 seats in Parliament, the vast majority in "open" constituencies where there was no secret ballot.

Electoral system
Prior to the election the United Party-led government changed the electoral system in order to ensure it retained its leading position. This involved reintroducing open elections and restricting the electoral census. The reforms were passed by a decree by Prime Minister István Bethlen as Parliament had already been dissolved.

For the election the country was divided into 219 constituencies. Of these, 215 were single member constituencies and four multi-member constituencies. Within the 215 single member constituencies, only 20 were elected by secret ballot, the remainder (which were rural constituencies) using open elections. All four multi-member constituencies used secret ballots.

Results

By constituency type

Notes

References

Hungary
Elections in Hungary
Parliamentary

hu:Magyarországi országgyűlési választások a Horthy-rendszerben#Az 1922-es választások